Sierra Leone–Yugoslavia relations were historical foreign relations between Sierra Leone and now split-up Socialist Federal Republic of Yugoslavia. Two countries established formal diplomatic relations in 1961. Both countries were member states of the Non-Aligned Movement and cooperated in the United Nations in bridging the Cold War divisions. Two countries reached the peak of their diplomatic relations in cooperation on the issue of Rhodesia.

History
Just a couple of months after the independence of Sierra Leone Yugoslavia became one of 17 original members of the Special Committee on Decolonization where its representative Miša Pavićević urged the General Assembly to push United Kingdom to give independence to its remaining colonies. Sierra Leone and Yugoslavia subsequently cooperated in the pursuance of decolonization policies.

Sub-Committee on Southern Rhodesia
I 1964 Special Committee on Decolonization (C-24) established five-member Sub-Committee on Southern Rhodesia which included Ethiopia, Sierra Leone, Mali, Yugoslavia and United Nations secretary of the sub-committee. Sub-Committee on Southern Rhodesia held its meetings in London between May 30 and June 5 and submitted its Report to the C-24 on June 22 in which it criticized British unwillingness to cooperate with the United Nations and to take active role in resolution of the Southern Rhodesia situation. British unwillingness was caused by London's position that Southern Rhodesia is self-governing entity.

In 1971 in Freetown two countries signed the 2 years Program of Technical Cooperation. In August of the same year Džemal Bijedić received Sierra Leonese delegation led by the minister of finances, minister of foreign affairs and minister of public works.

The end of the Cold War
At the end of the Cold War both countries faced military conflict with Sierra Leone Civil War (1991–2002) and Yugoslav Wars (1991–2002) which led to Breakup of Yugoslavia. Those conflicts subsequently influenced writings of Scottish and Sierra Leonean writer Aminatta Forna whose novels were translated into Serbo-Croatian in Bosnia and Croatia.

See also
Yugoslavia and the Non-Aligned Movement
Yugoslavia and the Organisation of African Unity
Yugoslavia–Zimbabwe relations
Yugoslav Wars
United Nations Protection Force
United Nations Confidence Restoration Operation in Croatia
United Nations Mission in Bosnia and Herzegovina
United Nations Transitional Administration for Eastern Slavonia, Baranja and Western Sirmium
United Nations Mission of Observers in Prevlaka
United Nations Preventive Deployment Force
International Criminal Tribunal for the former Yugoslavia
Sierra Leone Civil War
United Nations Mission in Sierra Leone
Special Court for Sierra Leone
Death and state funeral of Josip Broz Tito

References

Sierra Leone
Yugoslavia
Sierra Leone–Yugoslavia relations